Events from the year 1828 in Scotland.

Incumbents

Law officers 
 Lord Advocate – Sir William Rae, Bt
 Solicitor General for Scotland – John Hope

Judiciary 
 Lord President of the Court of Session – Lord Granton
 Lord Justice General – The Duke of Montrose
 Lord Justice Clerk – Lord Boyle

Events 
 7 January – Rev. Henry Duncan describes his discovery of the fossil footmarks of quadrupeds (Chelichnus duncani) in Permian red sandstone at Cornockle Muir, near Lochmaben in Dumfriesshire, the first scientific report of a fossil track, in a paper read to the Royal Society of Edinburgh.
 9 March – an English gang make off with £28,350 after holding up the Glasgow branch of the Greenock Bank.
 April – David Stow opens his Drygate model school in Glasgow.
 15 June – 28 people are killed when the north gallery of the Old Kirk, Kirkcaldy, collapses during a sermon by popular preacher Edward Irving.
 8 August – the Ballochney Railway (near Airdrie, horse worked) is completed throughout.
 10 September – first public demonstration of Rev. Patrick Bell's reaping machine on his family's farm.
 17–24 December – Burke and Hare murders trial in Edinburgh: William Burke is sentenced to hang for his part in the murder of 17 victims (up to 31 October) to provide bodies for dissection by anatomist Robert Knox; his accomplice William Hare is released having turned King's evidence.
 Inhabitants of the island of Muck emigrate to Nova Scotia.
 St Stephen's Church, Edinburgh, is completed to the design of William Henry Playfair.
 Caird & Company established by John Caird in Greenock as marine engineers.
 James Beaumont Neilson patents the hot blast process for ironmaking.
 A steam road coach constructed by James and George Naysmith runs between Leith and Queensferry.
 Glasgow Co-operative Society established.

Births 
 4 April – Mrs. Oliphant, born Margaret Wilson, novelist and historical writer (died 1897 in London)
 16 August – John Waddell, railway contractor (died 1888)
 30 September – John Simpson Knox, soldier, recipient of the Victoria Cross (died 1897 in England)
 5 October – Alexander Gunn, grocery wholesaler (died 1907 in Canada)
 1 November – Balfour Stewart, physicist (died 1887 in Ireland)
 13 December – Alexander Shand, 1st Baron Shand, judge (died 1904)
 Alexander Crum, textile printer and Liberal politician (died 1893)
 Robert Doull, merchant and politician (died 1906 in Canada)
 John Small, librarian and scholar (died 1886)

Deaths 
 29 February – John Ainslie, cartographer (born 1745)
 11 June – Dugald Stewart, Enlightenment philosopher (born 1753)
 5 July – Andrew Duncan, physician (born 1744)
 20 December – Archibald Fletcher, reforming lawyer (born 1746)
 Robert Blair, astronomer (born 1748)
 William Drummond of Logiealmond, diplomat and philosopher (born c.1770)

The arts
 The Maitland Club is founded in Glasgow to edit and publish early Scottish texts.
 The Poetical Works of Thomas Campbell is published.
 Sir Walter Scott's novel The Fair Maid of Perth (or St. Valentine's Day; Chronicles of the Canongate, 2nd series) is published.

See also 

 1828 in the United Kingdom

References 

 
Scotland
1820s in Scotland